James "Akio" Xiang (born 12 Sep 1969) is a travel writer, broadcaster, TV host and columnist from Hong Kong.

Education 
Hong was born in Chengdu, Sichuan, China. He moved to Hong Kong when he was 15 years old with his family. He attended HKSYCIA Wong Tai Shan Memorial College during 1985 to 1989.

In 1992, he was awarded a BA in Psychology and Philosophy from the University of Hong Kong. He also studied German in Bremen University in 1990, and Japanese language from 1989 to 1992. Then he completed his Masters in Marketing at the Chinese University of Hong Kong.

Career 
Hong began his marketing career in two Japanese brands, namely Fujifilm Hong Kong (1992 to 1997) and Sony Computer Entertainment Hong Kong (1997 to 2013). He was awarded as 2006 Most Outstanding Marketer of the Year from HKMA due to his PSP marketing campaign.  

He was promoted as the first Chinese in the Board of Director in Sony in 2011.   

He moved from marketing to travel writing from 2009 when his first book《5000 Years of Adventure》(足足五千年) was published and  raised HK$500,000 for Heifer International Hong Kong. The electronic version of this book was ranked No. 1 at the Hong Kong eBook Chart for a consecutive 13 days.

Hong started to write columns for various newspaper since 2009 including Oriental Daily, The Sun(太陽報, 已關閉), HK Economic Journal, Metro Daily, am730, Sky Post 晴報,  Headline Daily, etc.

TV Works 
Hong later jointed TVB, Now TV and Cable TV to host a series of travelogue programs.

Publications 
Major works by Hong.

Radio Programme 
Hong has hosted a radio programme on Commercial Radio Hong Kong named Global Explorer (全世界嚮導) since 2018 that runs on Fridays from 10:30pm to 11:00pm.

References

External links 
Facebook 
Youtube 
Instagram

1969 births
Living people
Hong Kong columnists
Hong Kong writers
Alumni of the University of Hong Kong